The Wasatchian North American Stage on the geologic timescale is the North American  faunal stage according to the North American Land Mammal Ages chronology (NALMA), typically set from 55,400,000 to 50,300,000 years BP lasting .

It is usually considered to be within the Eocene, more specifically the Early Eocene. 

The Wasatchian is preceded by the Clarkforkian and followed by the Bridgerian NALMA stages.

Definition 
The age is named after the Wasatch Formation, a highly fossiliferous stratigraphic unit stretching across six of the United States from Idaho and Montana in the north through Utah and Wyoming to Colorado and New Mexico in the south.

Substages 
The Wasatchian is considered to contain the following substages:
 Sandcouleean: shares lower boundary with the beginning of the Wasatchian age and shares upper boundary with the base of the Graybullian.
 Graybullian: shares lower boundary with the end of the Sandcouleean subage and upper boundary with the base of the Lysitean.
 Lysitean: shares lower boundary with the end of the Graybullian subage and upper boundary with the base of the Lostcabinian.
 Lostcabinian: shares lower boundary with the end of the Lysitean subage and upper boundary with the beginning of the Bridgerian.

Wasatchian correlations

References 

 
Eocene life
Eocene animals of North America